Ableman's Gorge is a  Wisconsin State Natural Area located near Rock Springs, Wisconsin. The Natural Area is named after George Ableman, who settled Rock Springs in 1851 and named the community after the gorge area.

Formation
The cliffs are composed of Baraboo Quartzite below Cambrian sandstone, and conglomerate. The gorge formed along a layer of ancient sea sediment that hardened into sandstone then metamorphized into harder quartzite rock before being lifted into a vertical layer. The area was later submerged another time under sea which lead to another sandstone layer capping the quartzite.  The unique geological features of this gorge is only one of a few places where this type of rock can clearly be seen in the Midwestern United States. The gorge has a cooler climate than the surrounding areas, causing vegetation more often found in northern Wisconsin. It was designated to the State Natural Area program in 1969.

Use
The gorge was used by University of Wisconsin-Madison geology students for research. Students and visitors had difficult-level hiking to reach the gorge. After it was named a State Natural Area, it was owned by the Wisconsin Department of Natural Resources (WDNR). Local residents petitioned the WDNR for permission to build a trail on an abandoned rail line in 2005. The trail was built and had opened by 2014. The easy-level trail to reach the gorge and a half mile (1 km) difficult-level trail along the edge. The trail begins at a parking lot on Wisconsin Highway 136 near an artesian well. The Van Hise Rock is located within this gorge and is a prominent feature.

References

External links
 U.S. Geological Survey Map at the U.S. Geological Survey Map Website. Retrieved February 6, 2023.

Protected areas of Sauk County, Wisconsin
State Natural Areas of Wisconsin
Protected areas established in 1969
1969 establishments in Wisconsin